Feldstraße  station is a metro station located in St. Pauli, Hamburg, Germany. It is served by Hamburg U-Bahn line U3 (Ring line); the station handles an average of around 14,000 passengers per day.

Layout 
Feldstraße station is located between Feldstraße to the north, and Heiligengeistfeld to the south. The station is often used by passengers travelling to the Hamburger Dom fair at Heiligengeistfeld, as it is located closely to its northern entrance.

Service 
Feldstraße is served by Hamburg U-Bahn line U3; departures are every 5 minutes.

Gallery

See also 

 List of Hamburg U-Bahn stations

References

External links 

 Line and route network plans at hvv.de 

Hamburg U-Bahn stations in Hamburg
U3 (Hamburg U-Bahn) stations
Buildings and structures in Hamburg-Mitte
Railway stations in Germany opened in 1912